Cercospora longissima is a fungal plant pathogen.

References

longissima
Fungal plant pathogens and diseases